Villebaudon is a commune in the Manche department in Normandy in north-western France.

Transportation
Villebaudon is located on the crossroads of the D999 and the D13.

History
The village was liberated during operation 'COBRA' the breakout by the American army on 29 July 1944 after some very heavy fighting lasting 13 hours, 11 German tanks were destroyed and 180 German defenders killed.

See also
Communes of the Manche department

References

Communes of Manche